Demachi (written: 出町) is a surname. Notable people with the surname include:

Giuseppe Demachi Italian composer 
, Japanese speed skater
, Japanese Olympic athlete 

Japanese-language surnames